Noona is a rural locality within Cobar Shire, a local government area of New South Wales. It has a population of 21 people as of 2021.

Geography
The topography is flat with a Köppen climate classification of BsK (Hot semi arid). The climate is characterised by hot summers and mild winters. The annual average rainfall is 350 mm, although this is highly variable.

References 

Localities in New South Wales